Montereau is a railway station serving Montereau-Fault-Yonne, Seine-et-Marne department, northern France. It is on the Paris–Marseille railway.

External links

 
 

Railway stations in Seine-et-Marne